Carlos A. Coello Coello is a Mexican computer scientist, Professor at the UNSW School of Engineering and Information Technology, and researcher at the CINVESTAV. His paper "Evolutionary algorithms for solving multi-objective problems" has been cited over 7,800 times. He won the IEEE Kiyo Tomiyasu Award in 2013.

Selected publications
Coello, CA Coello. "Evolutionary multi-objective optimization: a historical view of the field." IEEE computational intelligence magazine 1.1 (2006): 28–36.
Coello, Carlos A. Coello, Gary B. Lamont, and David A. Van Veldhuizen. Evolutionary algorithms for solving multi-objective problems. Vol. 5. New York: Springer, 2007.
Coello, Carlos A. Coello, Gregorio Toscano Pulido, and M. Salazar Lechuga. "Handling multiple objectives with particle swarm optimization." IEEE Transactions on evolutionary computation 8.3 (2004): 256–279.
Coello, CA Coello, and M. Salazar Lechuga. "MOPSO: A proposal for multiple objective particle swarm optimization." Proceedings of the 2002 Congress on Evolutionary Computation. CEC'02 (Cat. No. 02TH8600). Vol. 2. IEEE, 2002.

References

Tulane University alumni
Mexican computer scientists
Year of birth missing (living people)
Living people